The Euphoria Tour was the ninth headlining concert tour by the Spanish recording artist Enrique Iglesias. The tour supported his ninth studio album, Euphoria (2010). Beginning in January 2011, Iglesias performed in the Americas, Europe, Asia, and Australia. It is estimated that the tour will have been seen by a total of 1,312,579 viewers

The tour ranked 38th in Pollstar's "Top 50 Worldwide Tour (Mid-Year)", earning roughly 20 million dollars. At the conclusion of 2011, the tour placed 23rd on Billboard's annual, "Top 25 Tours", earning over $30 million with 38 shows. Iglesias also won an award for Touring Artist of the Year for Euphoria World Tour at Billboard Latin Music Awards of 2012.

Background
Iglesias mentioned touring at an interview with ESPN, during the 2010 FIFA World Cup. Iglesias headed on a promotional tour for his album, performing in several music festivals in the United States including: KFRC's "Triple Ho Show", KMXV's "Jingle Jam" and KIIS-FM's Jingle Ball. The tour was officially announced via Iglesias website, only showing a few dates in France and England. Additional tour dates were added in North America, with the tour commencing in San Juan, Puerto Rico on January 29, 2011. While on tour, Iglesias was asked to be a judge on the U.S. version of The X Factor, however, he was unable to change his touring schedule to accommodate the show.

Femme Fatale Tour controversy
After completing the first leg of the tour, many media outlets rumored Iglesias joining Britney Spears on a co-headlining tour in the United States. When Spears officially announced her tour on Good Morning America, she stated Iglesias would join her. Within several hours, the singer's management released a statement stating Iglesias will not be joining Spears and will continue his solo tour. Although it was explained to be "strictly business", many media outlets speculated as to why Iglesias left the tour. Celebrity news site TMZ.com speculated the singer did no want to join Spears due to the controversies surrounding her previous tour. MTV News reported Iglesias dropped out after being advertised as Spears' opening act. Us Weekly followed with "inside sources" stating the deal was not complete and Iglesias did not need the promotion.

Iglesias took to Twitter to respond to all the rumors. He wrote:"Hey guys, sorry for the confusion regarding a possible tour in the summer with Britney Spears. We are on the Euphoria tour and will continue to do so including some soon-to-be-announced dates in US. So hope to see all of you soon" The singer would later remark his decision to not join Spears was because he felt everything was "rushed" and he was not fully convinced at the time. He continued to say he has respect for Spears as an artist and the possible tour would have been great for him and the fans. After completing the European leg of his tour, Iglesias announced a second North American leg with Pitbull and Prince Royce. Concerts in Europe, South America and Australia were announced as well. To introduce the tour, Iglesias stated, "I’m so excited to go out in the states, and this time with my good friends Pitbull and Prince Royce. It's going to be a great show and we hope to see all of you out there. This tour will be unforgettable!"

Critical response
For his 2011 tour, Iglesias received numerous positive reviews from music critics and fans. Critics applauded the singer for his showmanship on stage and his connection with the audience. Kristyn Lyncheski (The Setonian) praises the singer on his connection to his audience at Madison Square Garden. She further explains, "Iglesias seemed humbled to be on stage at MSG, the place he said he considered the greatest venue. He repeatedly told the audience, 'You don't know how good I feel'. Iglesias said he was grateful for the fans that have stuck by him since his debut in 1995." Basem Boshra (Montreal Gazette) writes Igelsias performance at the Bell Centre was nothing short of charismatic. He continues, "Iglesias has always struck me as someone who has a sense of humour about his sex-symbol status, and that was most definitely on display last night, particularly when he pulled a young woman onstage to dance … and hug … and kiss … and, when she demured, to firmly plant her hands on his butt."

As his tour progressed to the United Kingdom & Ireland, the reviews continued to constructive. Andrew Johnston (The Belfast Telegraph) notes Iglesias' ability to drive his audience wild. He adds, "Tonight (I’m Lovin’ You), with ‘loving’ changed to something coarser, and his between-song demands for his audience to 'get dirty' made this a decidedly over-18 affair." Gordon Barr (Evening Chronicle) thought highly of Iglesias' performance at the Metro Radio Arena versus his previous shows in England. He further states, "He was in the crowd within minutes, and the banter never relented throughout, with two Traceys being picked from the audience for some memorable moments on stage with their own pop Hero." For the same concert, Aranda Rahbarkouhi (The Journal) shared the same feelings as Johnston. She writes, "Looking around, the screaming was coming from the back of the arena. Enrique appeared on a small stage engulfed in fans where he sang Hero before returning to the main stage for 'Escape' before relenting to the endless chants for more, signing off with a reprise of 'Tonight'."

For his concert at the Manchester Evening News Arena, Dianne Bourne (City Life) gave the performance five out of five stars. She explains, "And it's a testament to Enrique's broad appeal that among the fans he hauls up on stage are a silver-haired maths teacher called Jeremy, who hilariously duets on 'No Me Digas Que No'; gobsmacked Manc housewife Anna, who can't quite believe she's got Enrique on her lap; and then later, for one of the highlights of the show, quivering 14-year-old Jenny for a tender serenade of his biggest hit, 'Hero'." Dave Simpson (The Guardian) thought differently then Bourne, giving the same concert two out of five stars. He says, "At one point, the 32-year old hauls elderly audience members on stage, seemingly purely to humiliate them. A grey-haired schoolteacher who insists he doesn't drink is plied with rum, while an equally embarrassed lady is told: 'Think of me when you're having sex tonight.' When Iglesias discovers she's out without her husband, he suggests to the schoolteacher: 'Fuck her.'"

Opening acts

Lemar (United Kingdom & Ireland, March 2011)
Pitbull (Australia) (North America, September-November 2011)
Havana Brown (Australia)
Prince Royce (North America, September-November 2011)
Nayer (North America, September-November 2011)
Jay Sean (Los Angeles, New York City, February 2011)
Mohombi (Windsor, Montreal)

Jim Bakkum (Rotterdam)
Shy'm (Nice, Paris)
Stan Van Samang (Hasselt)
Anna Abreu (Turku, Helsinki)
Sofia Nizharadze (Batumi)
Eldrine (Batumi)
Fanny Lú (Mexicali)

Setlist

Notes

Tour dates

Festivals and other miscellaneous performances
This concert was a part of "Summertime Ball"
This concert was a part of "MTV Live Georgia"
This concert was a part of the "Carnaval de Veracruz"
This concert was a part of the "Houston Livestock Show and Rodeo"
This concert was a part of the "Tigo Music Fest"
This concert was a part of WKSC-FM's "Fantabuloso"
This concert was a part of WXKS-FM's "Kiss 108 Concert"
This concert was a part of WKTU's "KTUphoria"
This concert was a part of WIOQ's "Springle Ball"
This concert was a part of WHYI-FM's "Ultimate Pool Party"
This concert was a part of the "Monte-Carlo Sporting Summer Festival"

Cancellations and rescheduled shows

Box office score data

Awards and nominations

References

External links
Official Website 

2011 concert tours
2012 concert tours
Enrique Iglesias concert tours